ChalkZone is an American animated television series created by Bill Burnett and Larry Huber for Nickelodeon. The series follows Rudy Tabootie, an elementary school student who discovers a box of magic chalk that allows him to draw portals into the ChalkZone, an alternate dimension where everything ever drawn on a blackboard and erased turns to life. Rudy is joined in his adventures by Snap, a wisecracking superhero Rudy once drew with chalk, and Penny Sanchez, Rudy's academically intellectual classmate and personal friend.

ChalkZone originally premiered as a pilot short on Fred Seibert's Oh Yeah! Cartoons animated shorts showcase in 1998. The series ran on Nickelodeon from March 22, 2002, to August 23, 2008, with 40 episodes in total. It was produced by Frederator Studios and Nickelodeon Animation Studio.

Premise
Rudy Tabootie (voiced by E. G. Daily) is a 10-year-old, fifth-grade boy who loves to draw. Reggie Bullnerd (Candi Milo), the school bully, constantly teases him or gets him into trouble with Mr. Wilter (Robert Cait), Rudy's grumpy school teacher who strongly dislikes cartoons, especially Rudy's passion for art. One day while in detention, Rudy discovers a piece of "White Lightnin'" chalk, which allows access to the ChalkZone, a place where everything and everyone that has ever been drawn and erased by chalk takes form as living or is tangible. He soon makes friends with Snap (Candi Milo), a short, blue, humanoid drawing made by Rudy when he was only 8. Snap wears a superhero outfit and is very adventurous and funny. Rudy only lets one other person know about ChalkZone, his best friend Penny Sanchez (speaking voice, Hynden Walch; singing voice, Robbyn Kirmssè), who acts as the genius of the group.

While in ChalkZone, the three are introduced to Cyclops (Rodger Bumpass), the kilt-wearing guardian of the magic chalk mines where Rudy obtains his magic chalk (Rudy later draws a second eye for him and renames him "Biclops"); Queen Rapsheeba (Rosslynn Taylor), ChalkZone's musical artist whom Snap has a crush on; and Blocky (Candi Milo; Robert Cait), a light green block friend of Snap's and Rudy's first-ever drawing. They also face villains such as Skrawl (Jim Cummings), a drawing who blames Rudy for being ugly and wants to destroy him, and the Craniacs (Rob Paulsen), a series of robot drawings obsessed with collecting futuristic devices.

Episodes

Characters

Main
 Rudolph Bartholomew "Rudy" Tabootie (voiced by E.G. Daily) is the main protagonist. He is in 5th grade. He travels to ChalkZone with his best friends Penny and Snap. He has magic chalk that he can use to draw portals into ChalkZone and draw things out of thin air. He is 10 (8 in Oh Yeah! Cartoons) years old.
 Snap (voiced by Candi Milo) is a short blue, humanoid drawing made by Rudy, and his best friend. Created by Rudy when he was 8 years old, Snap speaks with a New Jersey accent, and is adventurous and funny. Snap wears a superhero costume.
 Penelope Victoria "Penny" Sanchez (voiced by Hynden Walch) is Rudy's Latina best friend and crush, a genius who helps him, and is the only other human besides Rudy who knows about ChalkZone. She is also in 5th grade just like Rudy. It has been revealed that she has a crush on Rudy. She is the same age as Rudy.

Supporting
 Reginald  "Reggie" Bullnerd (voiced by Candi Milo) is the school bully. Gets stuck in a bunch of things and his full name, Reginald Brunicky Tracey Aloysius Socrates Yauney Sunshine Bullnerd, was revealed by Rudy in the episode "Teachers' Lounge". He gets into trouble all the time and even has a school record with its own file drawer.
 Joseph Walter "Joe" Tabootie (voiced by Jess Harnell) is Rudy's father, who runs a meat shop. His voice resembles that of Ned Flanders from The Simpsons, but in a high-distorted pitch.
 Mildred Trish "Millie" Tabootie (voiced by Miriam Flynn) is Rudy's mother, who calls Rudy down in an opera singing-esque voice.
 Horace T. Wilter (voiced by Robert Cait): Horace is Rudy's cartoon-hating school teacher, despite that he once enjoyed cartoons when he was younger. Wilter is also annoyed by Rudy's love of art, telling him that it will get him nowhere in life, despite Rudy proving him wrong. He comes close to learning about ChalkZone in the episode "Secret Passages."
 Veronica Sanchez (voiced by Nika Futterman) is Penny's mother, who is a doctor and scientist.
 Tilly McNally (voiced by Grey DeLisle) is Rudy's aunt and Millie's sister.
 Sophie McNally (voiced by Grey DeLisle) is Rudy's 2-year old cousin, Joe and Millie's niece and Tilly's only daughter.
 Biclops (voiced by Rodger Bumpass) is the guardian of the Magic Chalk Mines. He was originally named "Cyclops" until Rudy gave him a second eye. He wears a Scottish attire, including a kilt around his legs. His two eyes are drawn on top of each other. He speaks in a slight Scottish accent.
 Queen Rapsheeba (voiced by Rosslynn Taylor) is ChalkZone's musical artist. Snap has had a crush on her forever and Rapsheeba is very fond of him as well.
 Blocky (voiced by Robert Cait and Candi Milo in his earlier appearances) is Snap's friend. He is a light green block and is claimed to be Rudy's first-ever drawing.
 Skrawl (voiced by Jim Cummings) was a drawing that was messed up by a bunch of kids at a birthday party Rudy had gone to. Skrawl blames Rudy for being ugly and wants to destroy him. Besides Reggie, Skrawl is one of the villains in the show. His most recent appearances are in "The Skrawl" and "Double Trouble."
 Granny in the Bathtub (voiced by Miriam Flynn) is a drawing that Rudy made, intended for humor.
 Chalk Dad (voiced by Jess Harnell) is a drawing Rudy made, who resembles and sounds similar to Rudy's father and his voice also resembles that of Ned Flanders from The Simpsons, but in a high-distorted pitch.
 The Craniacs (voiced by Rob Paulsen) are a series of robot drawings obsessed with collecting futuristic devices.  The current version is Craniac 4, drawn by Rudy to get rid of Craniac 3.  The Craniacs are based on Brainiac from the Superman comics.
 Bruno Bullnerd (voiced by Jeff Bennett) is Reggie's father who works as a sanitation engineer.
 Vinnie Raton (voiced by Rob Paulsen) is a Greaser who first appears in "Hole In the Wall" where he destroys Joe and Millie's old school they attended when they were Rudy and Penny's age. He later finds out about the truth of ChalkZone
 Terry Bouffant (voiced by Grey DeLisle) Terry is the news reporter for Plansville. In the episode "Indecent Exposure" she finally discovers the truth about ChalkZone

Production
ChalkZone was the creation of Bill Burnett and Larry Huber, with Huber's idea of a boy with magic chalk and Burnett's idea of a world behind the chalkboard. The concept's origin dated back during the production of Hanna Barbera's What a Cartoon! where Seibert originally wanted Huber to develop a cartoon for the showcase and assigned him with Burnett, who was writing for Cow and Chicken at the time, to develop a pilot for a potential series. Development fell through at the last minute from the result of Warner Bros. Animation acquiring Hanna Barbera Cartoons. The concept came back when Seibert developed Frederator Studios and was pitched as a short on Nickelodeon's Oh Yeah! Cartoons before getting the greenlight in 1998. In 1999, ChalkZone became the first spin-off of Oh Yeah! Cartoons to enter production and be greenlit. Despite this, ChalkZone did not make it to the air until 2002, as the initial 13 green-light episodes were shortened to 6 due to executive reasons, all which were completed by 2000. The show's air-date was up for debate until the lack of new programming and America's critical situation at the time led the decision to air the series in 2002. Frederator Studios announced in 2005 that the series had been cancelled at 40 episodes.

The show is remembered for featuring one-minute music videos sung by Rudy and his friends at the end of each episode. Several songs Bill Burnett composed before ChalkZone's production, i.e. Insect Aside and Dream Alotta Dreams, were implanted into the series. A well-liked rumor about the show is that it was based on Simon in the Land of Chalk Drawings. Bill Burnett denied this in a 2013 interview, claiming that he wasn't even aware of the series' existence until after ChalkZone entered production, although Burnett did mention that Harold and the Purple Crayon was an influence on Larry's idea for the "boy with magic chalk" concept.  A one-hour special, "The Big Blow Up", premiered on August 6, 2004. The final season featured new character designs with a slimmer line quality and a zooming chalk transition as new artists and overseas studios were used for the remainder of the series.

The show had four different variations of the theme song released to the public, one from the 2001 Nickelodeon album, "The Newest Nicktoons", which used a synthesizer instead of a guitar and had an earlier version of Penny's voice which was a demo Bill Burnett created in order for the song to get the green-light, an earlier version of the final version from the album "ChalkZone: In The Zone", where the guitar was used and Penny's earlier voice was still used, and the final version which was shown on regular episodes. Another variation was shown in the 1999 pilot, which not only featured a slightly different opening sequence and logo from the final series but also features a preparatory track mix of the final version and the second demo albeit with some modified vocals, also with Penny's final voice used. Bill Burnett's original idea for the concepts' score was something in akin to simplistic children's toy instrument melodies to fit the show's children's "chalk-drawing" theme, but the Nickelodeon crew suggested a more techno rock-based score to give the show a huge contrast from the premise. Steve Rucker was brought into the music composition team and some of his compositions were later re-written upon request by Burnett and Moon to fit the series better, much to his discourage.

Broadcast
The pilot for the series first aired on December 31, 1999, as part of Nickelodeon's annual New Year's Eve block, but due to being delayed by Nickelodeon for executive reasons, the series made its official premiere on March 22, 2002, as the highest-rated premiere in Nickelodeon's history up to that point.

The show aired in reruns on "Nick on CBS" for more than a year from February 1, 2003, to September 11, 2004. In June 2005, following the announcement that the series had been cancelled, the fourth season of the series premiered. Of the season's 11 episodes, only five would be aired that year before Nickelodeon abruptly halted the broadcast of new episodes. The remaining six episodes would not air until three years later in June and August 2008. The final episode aired on August 23, 2008.

Since the series' cancellation, reruns aired on Nicktoons until October 30, 2016. ChalkZone reruns aired on NickSplat (then known as "The Splat") for two nights only on November 12 and 13, 2016, as part of a block that ran every weekend from August until December commemorating the 25th anniversary of the Nicktoons franchise. NickSplat –including ChalkZone–  was a subscription channel based on VRV from 2018 to 2020.

Home media
During the show's original run, there were no DVD releases specifically for ChalkZone. The episode "Future Zone" was released on the Nickstravaganza! VHS. Three episodes ("Gift Adrift", "French Fry Falls", and "Eschucha Mi Corazon") were released for the Nickstravaganza! 2 DVD (only "French Fry Falls" was included on the VHS). The Christmas episode, "When Santas Collide", was featured on the 2006 DVD Nick Picks Holiday. A Complete Series DVD set was released through Amazon.com's CreateSpace manufacture-on-demand program on October 13, 2014; the release is missing the episode "The Smooch" due to music licensing issues. A soundtrack album In the Zone has also been released. The entire series is available on Amazon Video and the PlayStation Store, as well as available for streaming on Paramount+.

Reception

Critical
Joly Herman of Common Sense Media rated the series 3 out of 5 stars, saying, "What makes this show interesting is that it acknowledges that worlds of imagination are available to all of us. But while it's true that we love to get lost in a story, for a young child, getting as lost in a world as Rudy does can be scary." Lana Berkowitz from The Houston Chronicle wrote, "There are flashes of fun in [ChalkZone], the action moves along, and there's no violence. But cartoon connoisseurs, particularly those who stay tuned after loony SpongeBob SquarePants at 7 p.m., probably will need something more intriguing to keep their attention." Berkowitz further added, "After a clever setup, Chalkzone settles into a predictable zone with stories that could easily be erased from memory." Allison Fass of The New York Times praised the imagination and creativity in the series, but she opined that series creator Bill Burnett's message, "We have to take responsibility for what we create", may be "a little mature" for children.

Awards and nominations

References

External links

 ChalkZone at Frederator Studios
 
 

2002 American television series debuts
2008 American television series endings
2000s American animated television series
2000s American school television series
2000s Nickelodeon original programming
American children's animated adventure television series
American children's animated comedy television series
American children's animated fantasy television series
American children's animated musical television series
Animated television series about children
Elementary school television series
English-language television shows
Frederator Studios
Nicktoons
Television shows set in Wisconsin